Cougar is a slang term for a woman who seeks romantic or sexual relationships with significantly younger men, women or both.

Terminology and age
The origin of the word cougar as a slang term is debated, but it is thought to have originated in Western Canada and first appeared in print on the Canadian dating website Cougardate.com possibly as early as 1999. It has also been stated to have "originated in Vancouver, British Columbia, as a put-down for older women who would go to bars and go home with whoever was left at the end of the night".  Though, like many formerly derogatory terms, there has been an increasing effort to "reclaim" the term in recent years.

The term has been variously applied to middle-aged women who pursue romantic or sexual relations with men more than ten years younger than they are.

Academia
A 2010 British psychological study published in Evolution and Human Behavior asserted that men and women, in general, continue to follow traditional gender roles when searching for mates, and thus concluded that the posited "cougar phenomenon" does not exist, or more precisely, exists but is rare. The study found that most men preferred younger, physically attractive women, while most women, of any age, preferred successful, established men their age or older. The study found very few instances of older women pursuing much younger men and vice versa. The study has been criticized, however, for limiting their results to online dating profiles, which are traditionally not used by those seeking older or younger partners, and for excluding the United States from the study.

Media
The cougar concept has been increasingly used in television shows, advertising, and film. The 2007 film Cougar Club was dedicated to the subject and, in spring 2009, TV Land aired a reality show called The Cougar where an older woman would pick a date from twenty younger men. The 2009 sitcom Cougar Town originally explored the difficulty and stigma of many so-called cougars. In The Graduate (1967), a married mother pursues a much younger man (21 in the film). On the soap opera Days of Our Lives, character Eve Donovan is a cougar, repeatedly sleeping with the much younger JJ Deveraux.

The "cougar phenomenon", as it is called, is frequently associated with present-day, glamorous celebrities such as Madonna, Sam Taylor-Johnson and Demi Moore. However, it has been claimed that the trend of influential women dating younger men extends back a lot further through history to notable figures including Cleopatra, Catherine the Great and Elizabeth I.

Rasa von Werder, also known as Kellie Everts, had become a self-proclaimed cougar herself and photographer of younger men in her later years, in and around the college town of Binghamton, New York.  At Binghamton University, she was interviewed by and featured several times on the front page of their student newspaper. She has written extensively about her experience as well as the general social phenomenon in several books, including Old Woman, Young Man: Why They Belong Together, Parts I and II (2011 and 2019, respectively).

See also
 Age disparity in sexual relationships
 Ageplay
 Ephebophilia
 Evolutionary psychology
 Gigolo
 Gold digger
 Hebephilia
 Himbo
 Jailbait
 MILF
 DILF
 Phaedra complex
 Sugar dating
 Transactional sex

References

External links

Sexuality and age
Sexual slang
Slang terms for women
Metaphors referring to animals
Age-related stereotypes
Pejorative terms for women